New energy may refer to:

 Alternative energy, any energy source other than fossil fuels, which include:
 Renewable energy, energy from resources which are naturally replenished on a human timescale, such as sunlight, wind, surface water, tides, wind waves and geothermal heat
 Nuclear power, the atomic energy harvested from the decay, fission or fusion of elemental atoms
Perpetual motion or "free energy", an elusive energy source which would violate the laws of thermodynamics

Art, entertainment, and media
New Energy, an album by British musician Four Tet

Businesses and organizations
 Icelandic New Energy, Iceland energy company promoting hydrogen fuel
 Institute of Nuclear and New Energy Technology, China
 New Energy and Industrial Technology Development Organization (NEDO), Japan